Skier can refer to:

 Skier, someone who practices skiing
 Skier (cricket), a ball hit straight up into the sky